The Cabinet of Guinea is the highest executive body in Guinea.

List 

 Béavogui/Goumou government (since 2021)

References

See also 

 Politics of Guinea

Politics of Guinea
Guinea